Caroline County is the name of two counties in the United States:

 Caroline County, Maryland 
 Caroline County, Virginia